Aoupinieta setaria is a species of moth of the family Tortricidae. It is found in New Caledonia in the south-west Pacific Ocean.

The wingspan is about 29 mm. The ground colour of the forewings is brownish yellow, suffused and strigulated (finely streaked) with ferruginous. The hindwings are whitish, mixed with brownish grey posteriorly and with some darker strigulae.

Etymology
The species name refers to the ciliation of the antennae and is derived from Latin seta (meaning bristle).

References

Moths described in 2013
Archipini
Taxa named by Józef Razowski